"We Had It All" is a song written by Troy Seals and Donnie Fritts and originally recorded by Waylon Jennings on his 1973 album, Honky Tonk Heroes. It has since been covered by many artists, including Rita Coolidge, Dobie Gray, Susan Jacks, Willie Nelson, Dolly Parton, The Rolling Stones, Bob Dylan, Rod Stewart, Tina Turner, Conway Twitty, Ray Charles, Scott Walker, Green On Red, and Dottie West.

Chart performance

Waylon Jennings

Conway Twitty

Dolly Parton

Dolly Parton included the song on her 1984 album of covers The Great Pretender.  A remixed version of the song was later included on 1986's Think About Love, and the remixed version was released as a single in the fall of 1986, just as Parton was leaving RCA (her label of the previous nineteen years).  It would be her last charting single during her tenure with RCA.

References

1973 singles
1983 singles
1986 singles
Waylon Jennings songs
Conway Twitty songs
Dolly Parton songs
Scott Walker (singer) songs
Songs written by Troy Seals
RCA Records Nashville singles
1973 songs
Songs written by Donnie Fritts